David Allen Johnson (born April 7, 1963) is a former Olympic decathlete from the United States. A native of Montana, he grew up in Missoula and Corvallis, Oregon. He was part of Reebok's "Dan & Dave" advertising campaign, with fellow decathlete Dan O'Brien, leading up to the 1992 Summer Olympics in Barcelona, Spain, where he won a bronze medal in the decathlon. After retiring from competitive athletics he became a school teacher and administrator, serving as athletic director of Corban University in Salem, Oregon starting in 2009. Johnson accepted a position as Director with the Fellowship of Christian Athletes Oregon in June 2012. On November 14, 2012, Johnson resigned from Corban to devote more time to the Fellowship of Christian Athletes.  He now coaches pole vault & hurdles at South Salem High School.

Early life
David Johnson was born in Missoula, Montana. As a child he attended C. S. Porter Elementary School and later attended Sentinel and would have graduated from Big Sky High School. Johnson's family moved to Corvallis, Oregon, in 1980, and he attended Crescent Valley High School, graduating in 1981. He was involved in a series of petty thefts as a teenager, primarily stealing soda pop and beer from local distributors with an assortment of childhood friends until one of them was caught and informed on the rest. He later detailed his experiences to reporters prior to the Barcelona Olympic games and used the material for his book and speaking tour as an example on how to turn one's life around.

During adolescence Johnson was afflicted with Osgood-Schlatter disease in both knees that kept him from participating in high school sports for the most part. During his junior high years he excelled in track, touch football and was on a Kiwanis basketball team for two years. In elementary school he played organized Little League baseball and had some familiarity with boxing.

Athletics
Even as a child Johnson was naturally fit and coordinated from neighborhood activities. He first tried football and track his senior year in high school. He played college football at Azusa Pacific University as a safety in 1982 and 1983. At Azusa he started to compete in the decathlon – at 6'2-1/2" (190 cm), he put his innate abilities and his constant physical training to use and began setting records. He graduated from the school in 1986 with a bachelor's degree in psychology, and later earned a master's degree in 2003 from the school in special education. After several years he was generally acknowledged as the best decathlete to date. At this time Dan O'Brien appeared on the scene and began to provide Dave with his first real competition. O'Brien and Johnson became good friends and consistently placed first and second in most events. O'Brien eventually began to be considered the best overall decathlete, but Johnson earned the recognition as the best at 2nd day events. Johnson was a member of the 1988 U.S. Olympic team.

For the 1992 Summer Olympics the team of "Dan & Dave" was promoted as the inevitable winners in the decathlon and the question of who would take first and who would be second was widely debated. Dan failed to qualify for the team when he no-heighted on the pole vault, leaving Dave as the presumed gold medal winner. Unfortunately, Johnson experienced a stress fracture in his left foot on the first day of events. He put on a shoe two sizes larger, laced it up tight, competed anyway and won the bronze medal. Johnson's endorsement career continued for at least a year after the Barcelona Olympic Games and included Oakley sunglasses, Pert shampoo, Ryder trucks, and Reebok shoes.

Later life
Johnson later retired from competition and became a motivational speaker as he finished a master's degree in Special Education. He also wrote the book "Aim High – An Olympic Decathlete's Inspiring Story" with Verne Becker. Until 2006, Johnson worked at Jefferson High School as a special education instructor and assistant principal in Jefferson, Oregon. He was inducted into the Oregon Sports Hall of Fame in 2005, entering with fellow decathlon competitor Dan O'Brien. He also has a wife and four children. For a couple years in the early 2000s he taught at West Albany High School in Albany, Oregon. Johnson then became the athletic director at South Salem High School to the north in Salem. In June 2009, he was named as the athletic director of Corban University, a small private college in Salem. He resigned from the position in December 2012 to pursue a ministry position with FCA. Johnson accepted a position with the Fellowship of Christian Athletes Oregon in 2013 and is a volunteer and consultant coach with South Salem High School, Corban, Salem Track Club, and Oregon State University.

In June 2017 Johnson and Dan O'Brien were the subjects of (and participants in) the ESPN Radio 30 for 30 podcast "The Trials of Dave and Dan" about the famous ad campaign and its aftermath.

Career statistics
PR: 8727 points
Broke American record
1989: 8549 points
Olympic bronze medal, 1992
8309 points
Olympic 9th-place finish, 1988
8180 points
U.S. national champion
1986: 8203w
1989: 8549
1990: 8600w
1992: 8649
World University Games champion, 1989
8216 points
Goodwill Games Gold Medal 1990

References

External links
 
 

1963 births
Living people
American male decathletes
Athletes (track and field) at the 1988 Summer Olympics
Athletes (track and field) at the 1992 Summer Olympics
Olympic bronze medalists for the United States in track and field
People from Albany, Oregon
Sportspeople from Salem, Oregon
Sportspeople from Missoula, Montana
Azusa Pacific University alumni
Track and field athletes from Montana
Track and field athletes from Oregon
Medalists at the 1992 Summer Olympics
Azusa Pacific Cougars football players
American football safeties
Universiade medalists in athletics (track and field)
Goodwill Games medalists in athletics
Universiade gold medalists for the United States
Medalists at the 1989 Summer Universiade
Competitors at the 1990 Goodwill Games